Eochionelasmus ohtai is a species of symmetrical sessile barnacle in the family Chionelasmatidae.

Subspecies
These subspecies belong to the species Eochionelasmus ohtai:
 Eochionelasmus ohtai manusensis Yamaguchi & Newman, 1997
 Eochionelasmus ohtai ohtai Yamaguchi, 1990

References

External links

 

Sessilia

Crustaceans described in 1990